Brooklyn Street is a community in the Canadian province of Nova Scotia, located in Kings County.

References
  Brooklyn Street on Destination Nova Scotia

Communities in Kings County, Nova Scotia
General Service Areas in Nova Scotia